Kamelen Island is an island about  high, lying  southwest of the Einstøding Islands in the northern part of the Stanton Group, Antarctica. This island was mapped from air photographs by the Lars Christensen Expedition (1936–37) and named Kamelen (the camel).

See also 
 List of Antarctic and sub-Antarctic islands

References

Islands of Mac. Robertson Land